László Szűcs may refer to:
 László Szűcs (boxer) (born 1969), Hungarian boxer
 László Szűcs (footballer) (born 1991), Hungarian footballer